Jacob Daniel Auchincloss (born January 29, 1988) is an American politician, businessman, and Marine veteran serving as the U.S. representative for Massachusetts's 4th congressional district since 2021. He is a member of the Democratic Party.

Early life and education
Jacob Daniel Auchincloss was born in Newton, Massachusetts, to Laurie Glimcher and Hugh Auchincloss. Both of his parents are physician-scientists; his mother is president and CEO of Dana Farber Cancer Institute, and his father serves as acting director of National Institute of Allergy and Infectious Diseases (NIAID), succeeding Dr. Anthony Fauci in that role. Auchincloss's maternal grandfather, Melvin J. Glimcher, pioneered the development of artificial limbs, and was inducted into the National Academy of Sciences, and is the first cousin once-removed of stockbroker Hugh D. Auchincloss. His stepfather, Gregory Petsko, is a biochemist and biotech entrepreneur who has become a global expert on Alzheimer's disease. Auchincloss is matrilineally Jewish by descent, and was raised in his mother's faith.  His father is of Scottish heritage.

Auchincloss was raised in Newton with his two siblings, and attended Newton North High School. He studied government and economics at Harvard College, graduating with honors, and earned an MBA in finance from the Massachusetts Institute of Technology.

Career

Military service

After graduating from Harvard University, Auchincloss joined the United States Marine Corps, earning his commission through Officer Candidates School in Quantico, Virginia. He commanded infantry in Helmand Province in 2012 and a reconnaissance unit in Panama in 2014. In Helmand, he led combat patrols through villages contested by the Taliban. In Panama, his team of reconnaissance Marines partnered with Colombian special operations to train the Panamanian Public Forces in drug-interdiction tactics.

Auchincloss completed both infantry training in Quantico and the Marine Corps's reconnaissance training in California, profiled in Nate Fick's One Bullet Away. He graduated from the Survival, Evasion, Resistance, and Escape (SERE) school in Maine and was an honor graduate from the Basic Airborne Course in Georgia. He continued to serve in the Individual Ready Reserve after leaving active duty and was promoted to major on September 1, 2020.

Local government
After returning home from the military, Auchincloss ran for Newton city council on a platform of full-day kindergarten and expanded pre-K offerings. He was elected in 2015, defeating the incumbent councilor. He was reelected to the Newton city council in 2017 and 2019. He chaired the transportation and public safety committee. In office, he supported progressive immigration and housing policies, sustainable transportation and co-docketed the successful Sanctuary city ordinance.

When the Newton city council debated a pay raise for elected officials, Auchincloss voted no.

Auchincloss was the first elected official to endorse Ruthanne Fuller for mayor.

Business
While serving on the Newton City Council and attending MIT, Auchincloss was the director of the MIT $100K Entrepreneurship Competition. He also worked at a cybersecurity startup as a product manager and at Liberty Mutual as a senior manager at its innovation arm, Solaria Labs.

U.S. House of Representatives

Elections

2020 

On October 2, 2019, Auchincloss announced his candidacy for the open Massachusetts's 4th congressional district to succeed Joe Kennedy III, who unsuccessfully ran for the Senate against incumbent Democrat Ed Markey.

Auchincloss raised the most money during the primary election in both the fourth quarter of 2019 and the first quarter of 2020 and earned endorsements from the National Association of Government Employees, VoteVets, The Boston Globe and James E. Timilty. He earned the support of several Newton politicians, including the president and vice president of the city council and the chair and vice chair of the school committee. He earned additional endorsements throughout the district, including from state representative Paul Schmid of Fall River.

During the campaign, questions arose about his party affiliation. Auchincloss was originally a Democrat but was a registered Republican from 2013 to 2014 while working for Charlie Baker's gubernatorial campaign. He continued to vote in Republican primaries as an independent until late 2015 before becoming a Democrat again.

The Democratic primary occurred on September 1, 2020. In a race with eight other candidates, Auchincloss won with 22.4% of the vote. It took the Associated Press three days to call the race because nearly one million votes were cast through mail-in ballots due to the COVID-19 pandemic.

In the November general election, Auchincloss defeated Republican nominee Julie Hall. He assumed office on January 3, 2021.

Tenure 
On January 6, 2021, after the 2021 attack on the United States Capitol, Auchincloss tweeted his agreement with lawmakers' calls to remove President Donald Trump from office, either through the Twenty-fifth Amendment to the United States Constitution or impeachment. Auchincloss voted to certify the results of the 2020 United States presidential election in the early morning of January 7, 2021. On January 21, he voted to approve the congressional waiver for General Lloyd Austin, President Joe Biden's nominee for Secretary of Defense.

On June 16, 2022, seven people affiliated with The Late Show with Stephen Colbert, including Robert Smigel, were arrested by U.S. Capitol Police and charged with unlawful entry into the complex. According to a letter from Jim Jordan and Rodney Davis, the Colbert crew was let back into the building with the help of Auchincloss and Adam Schiff, leading to the unlawful entry charges. In a statement released by an Auchincloss spokesperson, Matt Corridoni said of the incident, "We do not condone any inappropriate activity and cannot speak to anything that occurred after hours."

Syria 
In 2023, Auchincloss was among 56 Democrats to vote in favor of H.Con.Res. 21 which directed President Joe Biden to remove U.S. troops from Syria within 180 days.

Committee assignments 

 Committee on Transportation and Infrastructure 
 Subcommittee on Highways & Transit
 Subcommittee on Coast Guard & Maritime Transportation
 Subcommittee on Railroads, Pipelines, and Hazardous Materials
 Committee on Financial Services
 Subcommittee on National Security, International Development and Monetary Policy
 Subcommittee on Diversity & Inclusion

Caucus memberships 

 Armenian Caucus
 Congressional Caucus on Black-Jewish Relations
 Congressional LGBTQ+ Equality Caucus
 Native American Caucus
 Portuguese American Caucus 
 Pro-Choice Caucus
 Addiction, Treatment and Recovery Caucus
 ALS Caucus
 Autism Caucus
 Diabetes Caucus
 Friends of Australia Caucus
 Gun Violence Prevention Task Force
 HIV/AIDS Caucus

Electoral history

Personal life
On July 28, 2017, Auchincloss married Michelle Gattineri. They had a son in April 2020, and a daughter in August 2021. They live in Newtonville, Massachusetts.

See also 
 List of Jewish members of the United States Congress

References

External links

 Representative Jake Auchincloss official U.S. House website
 Jake Auchincloss for Congress
 

|-

 

1988 births
21st-century American politicians
Auchincloss family
Businesspeople from Massachusetts
Democratic Party members of the United States House of Representatives from Massachusetts
Harvard College alumni
Jewish American people in Massachusetts politics
Jewish members of the United States House of Representatives
Living people
Massachusetts city council members
Massachusetts Independents
Massachusetts Republicans
MIT Sloan School of Management alumni
Military personnel from Massachusetts
Politicians from Newton, Massachusetts
American Jews from Massachusetts